Ephraim M. Wright was a Connecticut and Massachusetts teacher, clergyman and politician who served as 12th Massachusetts Secretary of the Commonwealth from 1853–1856.

Career
For many years Wright was engaged in teaching and political work.  Wright became a minister in middle life.  On July 2, 1861 Wright was ordained and installed as the eighth Pastor of the Congregational Church in Bethlehem, Connecticut, Wright was dismissed from the Pastorate on October 2, 1866.  For four years, from 1864 to 1869 Wright was the acting Pastor of Congregational Church in Terryville, Connecticut.

References

Secretaries of the Commonwealth of Massachusetts
19th-century Congregationalist ministers
American Congregationalist ministers
Year of death missing
Year of birth missing
People from Bethlehem, Connecticut
People from Terryville, Connecticut
19th-century American clergy